Ice Age Giants is a British television documentary series created and produced by the BBC Natural History Unit, first shown in the UK on BBC Two and BBC Two HD on 19 May 2013. The series steps back to 20,000 years in time and follows the trail of the prehistoric mammals in the ice age on North America and European region that lived through it to life by using the latest scientific knowledge and a little graphic wizardry.

The series was presented by Dr. Alice Roberts and composed by David Mitcham.

Broadcast

British television
Ice Age Giants debuted on British television on 19 May 2013, broadcast on BBC Two and BBC Two HD, which consisted of total three episodes.

International
The series premiered in Australia on Animal Planet on 24 June 2015.

Episodes

Merchandise

DVDs
In United States and Canada (Region 1), a single DVD was released by BBC Warner on 13 January 2015.

As for Australia and New Zealand (Region 4), it was released by ABC DVD/Village Roadshow on 6 August 2014.

See also
 Wild New World
 Planet Earth
 The Blue Planet
 Frozen Planet

References

External links
 
 

2013 British television series debuts
2013 British television series endings
2010s British documentary television series
2010s British television miniseries
BBC high definition shows
BBC television documentaries
BBC television miniseries
English-language television shows
Nature educational television series
Documentary films about prehistoric life